Oberthür (or Oberthur), a German and French-Alsatian family name, may refer to:

Companies 
 Oberthur Technologies, a French security services company
 Imprimerie Oberthur (Oberthur Printing), a historical French printing company founded by François-Charles Oberthür
 Oberthur Cash Protection, a French manufacturer of banknote protection systems

People 
 Charles Oberthür (composer) (1819–1895), German harpist and composer
 Franz Oberthür (1745–1831), German Roman Catholic theologian
 François-Charles Oberthür (1818–1893), French printer and amateur entomologist
 Charles Oberthür (1845–1924), son of François-Charles Oberthür, French entomologist specialised in Lepidoptera
 René Oberthür (1852–1944), son of François-Charles Oberthür, French entomologist specialised in Coleoptera